David Cool (born May 23, 1969) is a former Arena Football League player from Stone Mountain, Georgia.

Cool played college football for the Georgia Southern Eagles. He kicked two field goals in the 1988 NCAA Division I-AA Football Championship Game, which the Eagles lost to the Furman Paladins.

Cool was the placekicker for the Orlando Predators from 1998 to 2002, before finishing his career with the Chicago Rush and Tampa Bay Storm in 2003. Cool is likely best remembered for his game-winning field goal in ArenaBowl XIV in August 2000.

References

External links
 David Cool at ArenaFan Online

1969 births
Living people
People from Stone Mountain, Georgia
Sportspeople from DeKalb County, Georgia
American football placekickers
Georgia Southern Eagles football players
Orlando Predators players
Chicago Rush players
Tampa Bay Storm players